Priya Agraharam is a village in Polaki mandal of Srikakulam district, Andhra Pradesh, India.

Geography
It has an average elevation of 15 meters (52 feet).

Notable personalities
 Sangeeta Kalanidhi Sripada Pinakapani was born in this village.

References

Villages in Srikakulam district